The 1994–95 Villanova Wildcats men's basketball team represented Villanova University in the 1994–95 season.  The head coach was Steve Lappas.  The team played its home games at The Pavilion in Villanova, Pennsylvania, and was a member of the Big East Conference.

Roster

Schedule and results

|-
!colspan=9 style=| Regular season

|-
!colspan=9 style=| Big East tournament

|-
!colspan=9 style=| NCAA Tournament

Rankings

References 

Villanova Wildcats men's basketball seasons
Villanova
Villanova
Villanova
Villanova